Lek Yuen Estate is a public housing estate in Sha Tin, New Territories, Hong Kong. It is the first public housing estate in Sha Tin, built on the reclaimed land of Sha Tin Hoi, located near Wo Che Estate and MTR Sha Tin station. The estate consists of seven residential blocks completed in 1975.

History
Lek Yuen Estate was one of the first of a "new generation" of estates which were more self-contained with regard to the provision of amenities and shopping. Covered walkways allow tenants to do their shopping close to home, without relying on cars or trains. This is now a standard element of housing estate design in Hong Kong. When the old Sha Tin market was being demolished, many merchants were relocated to the Lek Yuen Estate shops, though some complained of comparatively "exorbitant" rents.

The shopping centre is now owned by The Link REIT. The estate locality has several other facilities including a market, a park, a public clinic, an entertainment building called "Sha Tin Fun City", and numerous schools. An elevated walkway runs through the estate, linking it to Sha Tin Town Centre (to the south) and Wo Che Estate (to the north).

On 24 September 2020, a man was found dead at the estate after a fire broke out on the fourth floor of Wing Shui House.

Houses

Demographics
According to the 2016 by-census, Lek Yuen Estate had a population of 8,131. The median age was 50.5 and the majority of residents (98.6 per cent) were of Chinese ethnicity. The average household size was 2.6 people. The median monthly household income of all households (i.e. including both economically active and inactive households) was HK$20,000.

Politics
Lek Yuen Estate is located in Lek Yuen constituency of the Sha Tin District Council. It is currently represented by Jimmy Sham Tsz-kit, who was elected in the 2019 elections.

COVID-19 pandemic
Some residents in Luk Chuen House at the Estate in June 2020, where confirmed cases were found.

See also

Public housing estates in Sha Tin

References

Residential buildings completed in 1975
Sha Tin
Public housing estates in Hong Kong
1975 establishments in Hong Kong